The University of Auckland (UoA) is a public research university based in Auckland, New Zealand. It is the largest, most comprehensive and highest-ranked university in New Zealand and consistently places among the top 100 universities in the QS World University Rankings. The institution was established in 1883 as a constituent college of the University of New Zealand. Originally it was housed in a disused courthouse. Today, the University of Auckland is New Zealand's largest university by enrolment, hosting about 40,000 students on five Auckland campuses. The City Campus, in the Auckland CBD, has the bulk of the students and faculties. There are eight faculties, including a law school, as well as three associated research institutes.

History

Origins
The University of Auckland began as a constituent college of the University of New Zealand, founded on 23 May 1883 as Auckland University College. Stewardship of the university during its establishment period was the responsibility of John Chapman Andrew (Vice Chancellor of the University of New Zealand 1885–1903). Housed in a disused courthouse and jail, it started out with 95 students and 4 teaching staff: Frederick Douglas Brown, professor of chemistry (London and Oxford); Algernon Phillips Withiel Thomas, professor of natural sciences (Oxford); Thomas George Tucker, professor of classics (Cambridge); and William Steadman Aldis, professor of mathematics (Cambridge). By 1901, student numbers had risen to 156; the majority of these students were training towards being law clerks or teachers and were enrolled part-time. From 1905 onwards, an increasing number of students enrolled in commerce studies.

Development of a research culture
The university conducted little research until the 1930s, when there was a spike in interest in academic research during the Great Depression. At this point, the college's executive council issued several resolutions in favour of academic freedom after the controversial dismissal of John Beaglehole (allegedly for a letter to a newspaper where he publicly defended the right of communists to distribute their literature), which helped encourage the college's growth.

In 1934, four new professors joined the college: Arthur Sewell (English), H.G. Forder (Mathematics), C.G. Cooper (Classics) and James Rutherford (History). The combination of new talent, and academic freedom saw Auckland University College flourish through to the 1950s.

In 1950, the Elam School of Fine Arts was brought into the University of Auckland. Archie Fisher, who had been appointed principal of the Elam School of Fine Arts was instrumental in having it brought in the University of Auckland.

Making a name

The University of New Zealand was dissolved in 1961 and the University of Auckland was empowered by the University of Auckland Act 1961.

In 1966, lecturers Keith Sinclair and Bob Chapman established The University of Auckland Art Collection, beginning with the purchase of several paintings and drawings by Colin McCahon. The Collection is now managed by the Centre for Art Research, based at the Gus Fisher Gallery. Stage A of the Science building was opened by Her Majesty Queen Elizabeth The Queen Mother on 3 May. In 1975-81 Marie Clay and Patricia Bergquist, the first two female professors, were appointed.

Growth and consolidation

Queen Elizabeth II opened the new School of Medicine Building at Grafton on 24 March 1970. The Queen also opened the Liggins Institute in 2002.

The North Shore Campus, established in 2001, was located in the suburb of Takapuna. It offered the Bachelor of Business and Information Management degree. The faculty was served by its own library. At the end of 2006, the campus was closed, and the degree relocated to the City campus.

On 1 September 2004, the Auckland College of Education merged with the university's School of Education (previously part of the Arts Faculty) to form the Faculty of Education and Social Work. The faculty is based at the Epsom Campus of the former college, with an additional campus in Whangārei.

Professor Stuart McCutcheon became vice-chancellor on 1 January 2005. He was previously the vice-chancellor of Victoria University of Wellington. He succeeded Dr John Hood (PhD, Hon. LLD), who was appointed vice-chancellor of the University of Oxford. On 16 March 2020, McCutcheon was succeeded by Professor Dawn Freshwater, the first female vice-chancellor in the university's history.

The university opened a new business school in 2007, following the completion of the Information Commons. It has recently gained international accreditations for all its programmes and now completes the "Triple Crown" (AMBA, EQUIS and AACSB).

In 2009, the university embarked on a NZ$1 billion 10-year plan to redevelop and expand its facilities. The $240 million Grafton Campus upgrade was completed in 2011. In May 2013 the university purchased a site for new 5.2-hectare campus on a former Lion Breweries site adjacent to the major business area in Newmarket. The Faculty of Engineering and the School of Chemical Sciences moved into the new faculties in 2015. The NZ$200 million new Science Centre was opened in July 2017. The NZ$280 million new Engineering Building was completed in 2019. In 2017, work started on the building of a new $116m medical school building in Grafton Campus. In 2019, work has begun with the redevelopment of the University Recreation Centre in the City Campus. The University of Auckland has also built multiple student accommodation buildings, and it became the largest provider of student accommodation in New Zealand.

Administration 
The head of the university is the chancellor, currently Cecilia Tarrant. However, this position is only titular. The chief executive of the university is the vice-chancellor, currently Professor Dawn Freshwater, who is the university's sixth vice-chancellor, and the first female to hold the role.

List of chancellors

Since 1957, when Auckland University College became the University of Auckland, the university has had 13 chancellors. Previously, the college council had been headed by a president (from 1923), or a chairman (1883–1923).

Schools and faculties 

 Faculty of Arts
 Business School
 Faculty of Creative Arts and Industries
 Faculty of Education and Social Work
 Faculty of Engineering
 Auckland Law School
 Faculty of Medical and Health Sciences
 Faculty of Science

Coat of arms 
The blazon of the arms of the University of Auckland is: Azure between three mullets argent an open Book proper edged and bound Or with seven Clasps on either side Or, on a chief wavy also argent three Kiwis proper. A "mullet" is a five pointed star; when there are three they are depicted with two above and one below. Their colour is silver ("argent"). "Proper" indicates that the specified item is to be shown in its natural colours – for the book, this would be black and white. The edge ("edged") and binding of the book is in gold ("Or") and is bound with seven clasps on either side. A "chief" is a broad strip at the top of the shield.

The university's motto is Ingenio et labore which may be translated from Latin as "By natural ability and hard work."

Campuses and facilities

Campuses

The University of Auckland has a number of campuses in Auckland, and one in Whangārei in the Northland Region.

The City Campus in the Auckland CBD has the majority of the students and faculties. It covers 16 hectares and has a range of amenities including cafes, health services, libraries, childcare facilities and a sports and recreation centre.
The Grafton Campus, established in 1968, is opposite Auckland City Hospital in the suburb of Grafton, close to the City Campus. The Faculty of Medical and Health Sciences, School of Pharmacy and School of Optometry and Vision Science are based here, along with the Eye Clinic.
The Epsom Campus is the main teacher training campus, offering programmes in teacher education and social services. It was formerly the Auckland College of Education's main campus, until the college merged with the university's School of Education in September 2004 to form the Faculty of Education and Social Work. There were plans to close down the Epsom Campus in 2020 and relocate the Faculty of Education and Social Work to the City Campus. Later, the closure of the Epsom Campus was postponed to late 2023, with teaching to resume at the City Campus's refurbished Building 201 in 2024.
The Newmarket Campus was acquired from Lion, when operations ceased at its Newmarket brewery in 2010, selling the site to the university in May 2013. The university has built an engineering research space and a civil structures hall. This new campus houses the Faculties of Engineering and Science.
The Tai Tokerau Campus in Whangārei offers teacher education courses to the Northland community.
The Faculty of Medical and Health Sciences also has several satellite campuses and research facilities including the Waitemata Health Campus (which services North Shore Hospital and Waitakere Hospital), the Freemasons' Department of Geriatric Medicine at North Shore Hospital, the South Auckland Clinical Campus at Middlemore Hospital, and the Waikato Clinical School.
The Leigh Marine Laboratory is effectively the marine campus and hosts postgraduate teaching and research at the Cape Rodney-Okakari Point Marine Reserve (Goat Island) near Warkworth. Situated on the east coast, about 100 km north of the city of Auckland, it has access to a wide range of unspoiled marine habitats.
The South Auckland Campus - Te Papa Ako o Tai Tonga opened in February 2020 in Manukau, and replaced the Faculty of Education courses that were offered at Manukau Institute of Technology (MIT) prior to the opening of the campus.
Goldie Estate – Wine Science Centre. In July 2011 Kim and Jeanette Goldwater gifted a 14-hectare winery in Waiheke Island to the university. The Wine Science Centre currently hosts the university's Wine Science courses.

From the start of the first semester of 2010, the university banned smoking on any of its property, including inside and outside buildings in areas that were once designated as smoking areas.

Former campuses
The Tāmaki Innovations Campus was located in the east Auckland suburb of St Johns. It was a predominantly postgraduate campus offering training and research security in health innovation and "biodiversity and biosecurity innovation." The Tamaki campus was closed down in 2020 and its former programs were relocated to the city, Grafton, and Newmarket campuses.

Overseas facilities
The University of Auckland Innovation Institute China (UOAIIC)
UOAIIC was established by the University of Auckland and UniServices, the commercialisation arm and knowledge transfer company of the University of Auckland, in 2017 in the Chinese city of Hangzhou. The Institute occupies a 2800m² physical space in the Hangzhou Qiantang New Area. UOAIIC is led by Dr Yuan Li. It organises annual conferences and meetings for the university to seek commercial opportunities for its research in China.

Aulin College
Aulin College, based in Harbin, China, was set up by the University of Auckland and the Northeast Forestry University (NEFU) of China in 2019. The name 'Aulin' is a combination of the word "Au" (from the name "Auckland") and "Lin", which is the Chinese word for farming and agriculture. In September 2019, Aulin College had its first intake of undergraduate students. Aulin College offers Bachelor's and master's degrees in Biotechnology, Chemistry, Computer Science and Technology. Graduates will receive degrees from both the University of Auckland and NEFU.

Libraries

The University of Auckland Library system consists of the General Library and seven specialist libraries: the Business and Information Centre, Davis Law Library, Leigh Marine Laboratory Library, the Philson Library, the Sylvia Ashton-Warner Library on the Epsom and Tai Tokerau campuses, and the Tāmaki Library and Information Commons.

In mid-2018, Vice-Chancellor McCutcheon announced that the university would be closing its Fine Arts, the Architecture and Planning, and Music and Dance Libraries. Their collections were merged into the General Library's collections.

The General Library Special Collections stores several rare books, manuscripts and archives and other material relating to the University of Auckland, New Zealand, and the Pacific Islands. Some notable manuscript collections include the Western Pacific Archives (which contains British colonial records relating to that region between 1877 and 1978), the poet Robin Hyde's papers, and the archives of the New Zealand Electronic Poetry Centre, local Labour Party branches, and the New Zealand Campaign for Nuclear Disarmament. The Special Collections also has several published collections including the Patterson Collection (which contains books on biblical studies, classics, and ancient history), children's author Betty Gilderdale's collection of New Zealand children's books, the Philson Library's collections of pre-1900 medical books, and the Asian Language Collection (which contains 230 titles of rare Chinese books).  Some notable microtext collections include the Māori Land Court Minute Books and the Pacific Manuscripts Bureau series.

Research institutes 
 Auckland Bioengineering Institute (ABI)
 Liggins Institute
 Public Policy Institute (PPI)

Student accommodation
The University of Auckland provides a range of accommodation options for students. Several hundred live in Residential Halls and Apartments, which provide, food, accommodation, and social and welfare services alongside self-catered, private residences. The university ceased leasing Railway Campus in November 2008.

The university has four residential halls including Grafton Hall, O'Rorke Hall, University Hall–Towers, and Waipārūrū Hall. These halls are full-catered and are aimed at first–year university students.

In addition, the university runs nine self-catered student residences including Te Tirohanga o te Tōangaroa, Carlaw Park Student Village, Grafton Student Flats, 55 Symonds, University Hall–Towers, UniLodge Auckland, UniLodge on Whitaker, Waikohanga House, and the Goldie Estate Homestead on Waiheke Island. These halls and student residences are located in the Auckland CBD area near the university.

Art Collection
Established in 1966 by Keith Sinclair and Bob Chapman, The Art Collection is one of the university's most valuable and cherished assets. However, its most poignant value lies in its use as a resource for teaching, learning and research. Available on loan to departments and faculties on all campuses, the Collection has been built up over forty years to include major works by significant artists such as Frances Hodgkins, Colin McCahon, Billy Apple and Ralph Hotere. Outcomes from postgraduate research on the Collection have included a thesis on its own history as an entity, monograph exhibitions on individual artists, and surveys of the impact of the evolution of the Collection on Auckland's dealer galleries, resulting in the exhibitions and publications Vuletic and His Circle (about the Petar/James Gallery) in 2003 and New Vision Gallery in 2008.

Student body

Students' association

The Auckland University Students' Association (AUSA) is the representative body of students, formed in 1891. AUSA publicises student issues, administers student facilities, and assists affiliated student clubs and societies. AUSA produces the student magazine Craccum, and runs the radio station 95bFM. The name of the alumni association is the University of Auckland Society.

Academics

Admission
Since eliminating open entry in 2009, all applicants must have a university entrance qualification. Domestic students are required to achieve the NZQA University Entrance Standard, while international students must achieve an equivalent approved qualification in their country. Admission to the university also requires applicants to meet the preset academic and English language entry requirements specific to the degree for which they are applying. Some programmes also have a preset number of places available within the degree. To be guaranteed entry students must achieve a rank score as well as meet any additional requirements.
All students who did not complete their high school education or equivalent in English are also required to provide a valid IELTS score (minimum of 6.0) or equivalent.

Rankings

The University of Auckland is New Zealand's leading university.  It is the highest ranked New Zealand university in the QS World University Rankings and Shanghai Jiao Tong Academic Ranking of World Universities, and along with the University of Otago and the Auckland University of Technology is included in the Times Higher Education top 250.

QS World University Rankings
2010 QS World University Rankings ranked University of Auckland 68th overall in the world, scoring very consistently in the subject rankings: 51st in Arts & Humanities, 55th in Engineering & IT, 41st in Life Sciences & Biomedicine, 68th in Natural Sciences and 38th in Social Sciences.

2011 QS World University Rankings ranked the University of Auckland 82nd overall in the world. In the subject rankings, it ranked less than the previous year: 55th in Arts & Humanities, 62nd in Engineering & IT, 50th in Life Sciences & Biomedicine, 73rd in Natural Sciences, 41st in Social Sciences and 33rd in Accounting & Finance.

2014 QS World University Rankings ranked the University of Auckland 92nd overall in the world. In the subject rankings, it continues getting less than previous years for most areas: 91st in Natural Sciences, 66th in Engineering & IT, 74th in Life Sciences & Biomedicine, 30th in Social Sciences and 35th in Arts & Humanities.

2015 QS World University Rankings ranked the University of Auckland 82nd overall in the world. In Faculty rankings, the university was placed 28th in Arts and Humanities, 34th in Social Sciences and Management, 59th in Engineering and Technology, 70th in Life Sciences and Medicine, and 134th in Natural Sciences.

2016 QS World University Rankings ranked the University of Auckland 81st overall in the world. The University of Auckland is ranked first in New Zealand in 35 of the 40 subjects, featuring in the top 50 in 15 subjects: 
Archaeology (20), Education (23), Development Studies (26), Psychology (29), English Language and Literature (31), Nursing (32), Law (32), Accounting and Finance (34), Geography (38), Civil and Structural Engineering (41), Architecture (44), Anthropology (44), Social Policy (49), Linguistics (49), Business and Management Studies (50).

University Impact Rankings
In 2020, the University of Auckland is ranked Number 1 globally in the University Impact Rankings by Times Higher Education. The result recognised the university's performance against the United Nations' Sustainable Development Goals, as well as the university's commitment to sustainability and making positive social impacts.

PBRF rankings
The University of Auckland is a research-led university, and had the second highest ranking in the 2006 and 2012 Performance Based Research Fund (PBRF) exercises and the fourth highest ranking in the 2018 PBRF exercise. The Performance Based Research Fund exercises are conducted by the government and evaluate the quality of researchers and research output of all tertiary institutions in New Zealand.

In the previous PBRF evaluation in 2003, when the university was ranked the top research university in New Zealand, the Commission commented: "On virtually any measure, the University of Auckland is the country’s leading research university. Not only did it achieve the highest quality score of any TEO [tertiary education organisation], but it also has by far the largest share of A-rated researchers in the country."

CECIL
CECIL (CSL, short for Computer Supported Learning) was the university's learning management and course management system before Canvas and was developed in-house. It had more than 44,000 log-ins per day (2008 April). Cecil support staff worked with academics on research into cheating detections during online assessment, productivity improvement using a learning management system (LMS), and effectiveness of tools in LMS. Cecil contains many of the features of similar systems such as Sakai Project and WebCT. Cecil also provides interactive tools for collaboration and other tools specific to the university. In 2014, a review of learning and teaching technology was initiated, seeking to replace Cecil. The review determined that Canvas (a learning management system developed by Instructure) would be implemented prior to the commencement of the 2016 academic year, and CECIL now acts as an archive for old courses.

Controversies

Restructuring measures
In April 2016, Vice-Chancellor Stuart McCutcheon announced that University of Auckland would be selling off its Epsom and Tamaki campuses in order to consolidate education and services at the city, Grafton, and Newmarket campuses. The Epsom Campus is the site of the University of Auckland's education faculty while the Tamaki campus hosts elements of the medical and science faculties as well as the School of Population Health.

In mid-June 2018, McCutcheon announced that the university would be closing down and merging its specialist fine arts, architecture, and music and dance libraries into the City Campus' General Library. In addition, the university would cut 100 support jobs. The Vice-Chancellor claimed that these cutbacks would save between NZ$3 million and $4 million a year. This announcement triggered criticism and several protests from arts faculty and students. Students objected to the closure of the Elam Fine Arts Library on the grounds that it would make it harder to access study materials. Thousands of dissenters circulated a petition protesting the Vice-Chancellor's restructuring policies. Protests were also held in April, May, and June 2018.

Fossil fuel divestment controversy
In April 2017, more than 100 students from the Auckland University Medical Students Association marched demanding the removal of coal, oil and gas from the university's investment portfolio. In May 2017, 14 people from student group Fossil Fuel UoA occupied the Clocktower, urging current Vice Chancellor Professor Stuart McCutcheon to issue a statement in support of divestment from fossil fuels. After twelve hours, they were forcibly removed by police. The following day over two hundred students and staff marched to demand divestment from fossil fuels and more than 240 members of staff from 8 faculties signed an open letter supporting divestment to the Boards of the University of Auckland Foundation and School of Medicine Foundation. Today, the University of Auckland Foundation has a Responsible Investment Policy. The foundation has now effectively eliminated fossil fuels from its investment portfolio. As at 31 December 2021, only 0.005% (31 December 2020 0.49%) of the foundation's investments were held in companies deriving revenue from fossil fuels.

Vice Chancellor's house
In early December 2020, the Auditor-General's Office released its report criticising the University of Auckland's decision to purchase a NZ$5 million house in Auckland's Parnell suburb for Vice Chancellor Dawn Freshwater, ruling that the university had not been able to show a "justifiable business purpose" for purchasing the house apart from Freshwater's personal benefit. The purchase of the house had been criticised as frivolous by student unions. In October 2020, Vice Chancellor Freshwater had recommended that the university's board sell the house to pay off debt and because COVID-19 social distancing restrictions had made it impossible to host functions there.

Notable people

Notable alumni

Academia

 Alexandra Brewis Slade, anthropologist
 Margaret Brimble, organic chemist
 Dianne Brunton, ecology academic, professor at Massey University
 Jemma Field, historian
 Colleen M. Flood, professor at University of Ottawa and Fellow of the Royal Society of Canada
 Rom Harré, Oxford philosopher
 Christian Hartinger, inorganic chemist
 Harry Hawthorn, Canadian anthropologist
 John Hood, former Vice-Chancellor of the University of Oxford
 Susan Kemp, social work academic
 Charlotte Macdonald, historian
 Diane M. Mackie, social psychologist
 Susan Moller Okin, philosopher
 Janis Paterson, academic developmental psychologist, founding director of the longitudinal Pacific Islands Families Study
 Peter C. B. Phillip
 Elizabeth Rata, professor of education
 Papaarangi Mary-Jane Reid, public health academic
 Graham Smith, academic
 Rory Sweetman, historian
 Ronald Syme, pre-eminent New Zealand classicist of the 20th century
 Tarisi Vunidilo, Fijian archaeologist and curator
 Rorden Wilkinson, political economist
 David Wills, translator of Jacques Derrida

Art
Vidyamala Burch, writer and mindfulness teacher
 Gill Gatfield, sculptor
Bob Kerr, artist and author
Rachael McKenna, photographer
Constant Mews, authority on medieval religious thought
Cheryll Sotheran, founder of the Museum of New Zealand Te Papa Tongarewa

Business

Vincent Cheng, chairman of HSBC
Shayne Elliott (born 1963/64), New Zealand banker
Paul Huljich, CEO of Best Corporation, author
 Ross Keenan (born 1943), businessperson
Jane Taylor, chair of New Zealand Post and Landcare Research

Film and television

Philippa Boyens, Academy Award-winning screenwriter
Niki Caro, film director, producer and screenwriter. 
Jacqueline Feather, screenwriter
Lucy Lawless, actress
Yasmine Ryan (ca. 1983 – 2017), journalist
Christine Tan, CNBC news anchor

Music
Marcus Chang, Taiwanese singer-songwriter & actor 
Gary Chaw, singer-songwriter
Gareth Farr, composer
Tim Finn, musician
Jeffrey Grice, pianist
Anthony Jennings, harpsichordist, organist, choral and orchestral director
Ashley Lawrence, conductor
Marya Martin, flautist
Douglas Mews, early music specialist
Shirley Setia, singer and actress
Wilma Smith, Fijian-born concert violinist and music teacher

Politics and law

Jan Beagle, Under-Secretary-General of the United Nations
Simon Bridges, former Opposition Leader, former leader of the New Zealand National Party
Helen Clark, former Prime Minister of New Zealand, former Administrator of the United Nations Development Programme
Colin Craig, businessman and leader of the Conservative Party of New Zealand
Jennifer Curtin, public policy
Sian Elias, New Zealand Chief Justice 1999-2019
Jeanette Fitzsimons, New Zealand politician and environmentalist
Lowell Goddard, Judge
Jonathan Hunt, former Speaker of the House of Representatives, Order of New Zealand
Sir Kenneth James Keith, New Zealand Judge appointed to the International Court of Justice
David Lange, former Prime Minister of New Zealand
Viliami Latu, Tongan Minister of Police
Tuilaepa Aiono Sailele Malielegaoi, Prime Minister of Samoa
Leslie Munro, former New Zealand's permanent representative to the United Nations, former President of the Trusteeship Council, former President of the United Nations General Assembly, three times President of the Security Council
Shai Navot, former leader of The Opportunities Party
Winston Peters, politician and leader of the NZ First party
Anthony Randerson, New Zealand Chief High Court Judge from December 2004 to February 2010. Now a Judge of the New Zealand Court of Appeal
Mike Rann, former Premier of South Australia, and future Australian High Commissioner to the United Kingdom
Anand Satyanand, Governor General, New Zealand 2006-2011
Peter Thomson, Fijian diplomat, Fiji's former Permanent Representative to the United Nations, former President of the General Assembly of the United Nations
Taufa Vakatale, former Deputy Prime Minister of Fiji
Vangelis Vitalis, diplomat
Helen Winkelmann, New Zealand Chief Justice 2019–present

Science and technology
Penelope Brothers, chemist
Howard Carmichael, physicist
Helen Danesh-Meyer, ophthalmology academic
Sir Richard Faull, Neuroscientist
Lynnette Ferguson
Crispin Gardiner, physicist
Ross Ihaka, statistician
Sir Vaughan Jones, Fields medallist
Sir Harold Marshall, acoustician and architect
Stephen Parke, physicist
Richard John Pentreath, British marine scientist 
William Sage Rapson, chemist
Daniel Frank Walls, physicist
Jennifer Mary Weller, anaesthesiology academic
Anne Wyllie, microbial disease epidemiologist

Sports

Jo Aleh (born 1986), sailor, national champion, world champion, and Olympic champion
Russell Coutts (born 1962), yachtsman
Richard de Groen (born 1962), Test cricketer and Olympic and Commonwealth Games administrator
Mahé Drysdale (born 1978), Australian-born New Zealand rower
Gavin Hastings (born 1962), Scottish rugby player
Michael Jones (born 1965), rugby player and coach
Jerome Kaino (born 1983), American Samoan-born New Zealand rugby player
Eliza McCartney (born 1996), New Zealand Olympic pole vaulter
Jean Spencer (born 1940), United Kingdom-born New Zealand Olympic gymnast

Notable faculty

Until his death in 2009, the longest serving staff member was Emeritus Professor of Prehistory, Roger Curtis Green, BA BSc (New Mexico), PhD (Harv.), FRSNZ, MANAS. He had been on the staff 1961–66 and from 1973 onwards. The longest serving, non-'retired' staff member is Bernard Brown, ONZM, LLB (Hons) (Leeds), LLM (Sing.). He has been a full-time senior lecturer in the faculty of law 1962-65 and 1969 onwards. William Phillips, the influential economist largely famed for his Phillips curve, taught at the university from 1969 until his death in 1975. The programming language R, widely used by statisticians and data scientists, was developed at the university by Robert Gentleman and Ross Ihaka in the 1990s.

According to the Association of University Staff of New Zealand (AUS) in 2007, New Zealand universities, including the University of Auckland, had been taking a more litigious approach to managing their staff in recent years and engaged lawyers and employment advocates to handle even minor matters. The University of Auckland "paid out more than $780,000 in 2006 to settle problems it listed as including personal grievances and disputes". For example, Paul Buchanan, a popular, world-renowned lecturer on international relations and security, was summarily dismissed in 2007 because a student to whom he sent an email complained that she found his comments about her performance in his class to be offensive. He was later reinstated, but this was just a formality and he never returned to lecturing. As the AUS would not financially support a case for full reinstatement, Buchanan accepted the formal reinstatement and a nominal monetary payout as a settlement of his appeal to the Employment Court.

Demographics

Auckland-University had a population of 105 at the 2018 New Zealand census, a decrease of 6 people (−5.4%) since the 2013 census, and an increase of 9 people (9.4%) since the 2006 census. There were 63 households, comprising 57 males and 48 females, giving a sex ratio of 1.19 males per female. The median age was 29.2 years (compared with 37.4 years nationally), with 6 people (5.7%) aged under 15 years, 54 (51.4%) aged 15 to 29, 39 (37.1%) aged 30 to 64, and 6 (5.7%) aged 65 or older.

Ethnicities were 28.6% European/Pākehā, 8.6% Māori, 5.7% Pacific peoples, 62.9% Asian, and 11.4% other ethnicities. People may identify with more than one ethnicity.

The percentage of people born overseas was 80.0, compared with 27.1% nationally.

Although some people chose not to answer the census's question about religious affiliation, 45.7% had no religion, 25.7% were Christian, 11.4% were Hindu, 5.7% were Muslim, and 11.4% were Buddhist.

Of those at least 15 years old, 54 (54.5%) people had a bachelor's or higher degree, and 0 (0.0%) people had no formal qualifications. The median income was $30,200, compared with $31,800 nationally. 9 people (9.1%) earned over $70,000 compared to 17.2% nationally. The employment status of those at least 15 was that 45 (45.5%) people were employed full-time, 18 (18.2%) were part-time, and 6 (6.1%) were unemployed.

Notes

References

Sources 

 A Complete Guide To Heraldry by A.C. Fox-Davies 1909.

External links 

 
 University of Auckland Act 1961

 
1883 establishments in New Zealand
Albert Park, Auckland
Auckland CBD
Auckland, University of
Universities in New Zealand